The Human Condition is a South Korean variety show that started airing on November 17, 2012 on KBS2. The show currently broadcasts on Saturday evenings at 11:15 p.m. UTC+09. It features 6 top Korean actors being followed by cameras 24/7, showing new sides to them through the program, as they participate in social experiments about timely issues in South Korean modern society.

Plot 
"Living without Cellphones, Television and Internet" is the theme for the 4-episode pilot. Park Seong-ho, Kim Jun-ho, Jeong Tae-ho, Kim Jun-hyeon, Heo Kyung-hwan, and Yang Sang-guk are brought together in a dorm and tasked to live without their cellphones, television, and the internet for the next week. The cameras follow the 6 comedians closely to document their daily lives without the use of these modern conveniences. As they go through the experience they realize the impact of gadgets in the modern world.

Season 1

Season 2

Season 3

Season 4

Cast

Season 1 - male Comedians/Singers/Announcer 
Park Seong-ho (Ep 1 - 58)
Heo Kyung-hwan (Ep 1 - 58)
Yang Sang-guk (Ep 1 - 58)
Kim Jun-ho (Ep 1 - 92)
Jeong Tae-ho (Ep 1 - 92) 
Kim Jun-hyeon (Ep 1 - 92)
Gaeko (Dynamic Duo) (Ep 62 - 92)
Jo U-jong (Ep 62 - 92)
Kim Kiri (Ep 68 - 92)

Season 2 - male Actors/Singer/Model 
Kim Jae-Young
Hyun Woo
Yoon Sang-hyun
Eun Ji-won
Bong Tae-gyu
Heo Tae-Hee

Female Comedians 
Kim Yeong-hui
Kim Shin-young
Shin Bora
Kim Ji-min
Kim Sook
Park So Young

Season 3 - male Chefs/Singers/Comedians 
Jeong Tae-ho
Yoon Jong-shin
Choi Hyun-seok
Jeong Chang-wook
Park Sung-kwang
Jo Jung-chi

Season 4 - Comedians/Singers/Former National Soccer Player
Jo Se-ho
Nam Changhee
Ahn Junghwan
Choi Yangrak
Stephanie (singer, born October 1987)

References

External links 
  
 

2012 South Korean television series debuts
Korean Broadcasting System original programming
Television series by SM C&C